The 2019 Barangay Ginebra San Miguel season was the 40th season of the franchise in the Philippine Basketball Association (PBA).

Key dates

2018
December 16: The 2018 PBA draft took place in Midtown Atrium, Robinson Place Manila.

2019
January 4: Jett Manuel officially announced his retirement after playing one season in the PBA for the Barangay Ginebra San Miguel franchise.

Draft picks

Roster

  Also serves as Barangay Ginebra's board governor.

Philippine Cup

Eliminations

Standings

Game log

|-bgcolor=ccffcc
| 1
| January 13
| TNT
| W 90–79
| Japeth Aguilar (21)
| Scottie Thompson (10)
| LA Tenorio (7)
| Philippine Arena23,711
| 1–0
|-bgcolor=ffcccc
| 2
| January 20
| San Miguel
| L 91–99
| LA Tenorio (24)
| Greg Slaughter (10)
| LA Tenorio (5)
| Smart Araneta Coliseum
| 1–1
|-bgcolor=ffcccc
| 3
| January 26
| Rain or Shine
| L 80–83
| Japeth Aguilar (19)
| Greg Slaughter (12)
| LA Tenorio (4)
| Calasiao Sports Complex
| 1–2

|-bgcolor=ccffcc
| 4
| February 2
| Columbian
| W 97–85
| Greg Slaughter (22)
| Scottie Thompson (14)
| Slaughter, Tenorio, Thompson (5)
| Ynares Center
| 2–2
|-bgcolor=ccffcc
| 5
| February 9
| Blackwater
| W 85–67
| Japeth Aguilar (20)
| Scottie Thompson (11)
| LA Tenorio (9)
| Davao del Sur Coliseum
| 3–2

|-bgcolor=ffcccc
| 6
| March 3
| Alaska
| L 78–104
| Japeth Aguilar (17)
| Greg Slaughter (14)
| LA Tenorio (4)
| Ynares Center
| 3–3
|-bgcolor=ccffcc
| 7
| March 10
| Phoenix
| W 100–97
| LA Tenorio (23)
| Greg Slaughter (11)
| Tenorio, Thompson (5)
| Smart Araneta Coliseum
| 4–3
|-bgcolor=ccffcc
| 8
| March 17
| Magnolia
| W 97–93 (OT)
| Scottie Thompson (27)
| Japeth Aguilar (12)
| Arthur dela Cruz (9)
| Smart Araneta Coliseum
| 5–3
|-bgcolor=ccffcc
| 9
| March 23
| NLEX
| W 105–96
| Japeth Aguilar (27)
| Japeth Aguilar (9)
| Scottie Thompson (8)
| Angeles University Foundation Sports Arena
| 6–3
|-bgcolor=ccffcc
| 10
| March 27
| Meralco
| W 86–76
| Greg Slaughter (18)
| Scottie Thompson (10)
| LA Tenorio (6)
| Smart Araneta Coliseum
| 7–3

|-bgcolor=ffcccc
| 11
| April 4
| NorthPort
| L 97–100
| Greg Slaughter (14)
| Scottie Thompson (11)
| Sol Mercado (11)
| Smart Araneta Coliseum
| 7–4

Playoffs

Bracket

Game log

|-bgcolor=ccffcc
| 1
| April 6
| Magnolia
| W 86–75
| Greg Slaughter (15)
| Greg Slaughter (12)
| J. Aguilar, Tenorio (7)
| Mall of Asia Arena
| 1–0
|-bgcolor=ffcccc
| 2
| April 8
| Magnolia
| L 77–106
| Sol Mercado (13)
| Japeth Aguilar (7)
| Scottie Thompson (4)
| Smart Araneta Coliseum
| 1–1
|-bgcolor=ffcccc
| 3
| April 10
| Magnolia
| L 72–85
| Jeff Chan (17)
| Scottie Thompson (19)
| Tenorio, Thompson (7)
| Smart Araneta Coliseum11,147
| 1–2

Commissioner's Cup

Eliminations

Standings

Game log

|-bgcolor=ffcccc
| 1
| May 24
| Blackwater
| L 107–108 (OT)
| Justin Brownlee (44)
| Justin Brownlee (10)
| Scottie Thompson (10)
| Smart Araneta Coliseum
| 0–1
|-bgcolor=ccffcc
| 2
| May 26
| Meralco
| W 110–95
| Justin Brownlee (27)
| Justin Brownlee (12)
| Scottie Thompson (10)
| Smart Araneta Coliseum
| 1–1

|-bgcolor=ccffcc
| 3
| June 1
| NorthPort
| W 73–70
| Justin Brownlee (32)
| Scottie Thompson (12)
| Justin Brownlee (6)
| Mall of Asia Arena
| 2–1
|-bgcolor=ffcccc
| 4
| June 7
| Rain or Shine
| L 81–104
| Justin Brownlee (30)
| Justin Brownlee (17)
| Scottie Thompson (10)
| Smart Araneta Coliseum
| 2–2
|-bgcolor=ffcccc
| 5
| June 12
| TNT
| L 96–104
| Justin Brownlee (29)
| Justin Brownlee (17)
| Scottie Thompson (8)
| Smart Araneta Coliseum
| 2–3
|-bgcolor=ccffcc
| 6
| June 16
| San Miguel
| W 110–107 (OT)
| Justin Brownlee (39)
| Greg Slaughter (18)
| Slaughter, Tenorio (6)
| Smart Araneta Coliseum
| 3–3
|-bgcolor=ccffcc
| 7
| June 23
| NLEX
| W 100–85
| Justin Brownlee (37)
| Brownlee, Pringle (8)
| Brownlee, Thompson (7)
| Batangas City Coliseum
| 4–3
|-bgcolor=ffcccc
| 8
| June 28
| Phoenix
| L 103–111
| Justin Brownlee (31)
| Justin Brownlee (15)
| Justin Brownlee (7)
| Smart Araneta Coliseum
| 4–4
|-bgcolor=ccffcc
| 9
| June 30
| Alaska
| W 118–106
| Brownlee, Pringle (27)
| Justin Brownlee (14)
| Brownlee, Pringle (8)
| Smart Araneta Coliseum
| 5–4

|-bgcolor=ccffcc
| 10
| July 7
| Magnolia
| W 102–81
| Justin Brownlee (49)
| Justin Brownlee (20)
| Justin Brownlee (7)
| Smart Araneta Coliseum
| 6–4
|-bgcolor=ccffcc
| 11
| July 14
| Columbian
| W 127–123 (OT)
| Justin Brownlee (50)
| Justin Brownlee (14)
| Scottie Thompson (8)
| Smart Araneta Coliseum
| 7–4

Playoffs

Bracket

Game log

|-bgcolor=ccffcc
| 1
| July 20
| Magnolia
| W 85–79
| Justin Brownlee (20)
| Justin Brownlee (16)
| Justin Brownlee (5)
| Mall of Asia Arena
| 1–0
|-bgcolor=ccffcc
| 2
| July 23
| Magnolia
| W 106–80
| Justin Brownlee (30)
| Justin Brownlee (9)
| LA Tenorio (7)
| Smart Araneta Coliseum
| 2–0

|-bgcolor=ffcccc
| 1
| July 26
| TNT
| L 92–95
| Justin Brownlee (23)
| Justin Brownlee (15)
| Justin Brownlee (9)
| Smart Araneta Coliseum
| 0–1
|-bgcolor=ffcccc
| 2
| July 28
| TNT
| L 71–88
| Justin Brownlee (25)
| Justin Brownlee (13)
| LA Tenorio (5)
| Smart Araneta Coliseum
| 0–2
|-bgcolor=ccffcc
| 3
| July 30
| TNT
| W 80–72
| LA Tenorio (16)
| Aguilar, Brownlee (11)
| Justin Brownlee (8)
| Mall of Asia Arena
| 1–2
|-bgcolor=ffcccc
| 4
| August 1
| TNT
| L 92–103
| Aguilar, Brownlee (27)
| Aguilar, Brownlee, Pringle (9)
| Justin Brownlee (8)
| Smart Araneta Coliseum
| 1–3

Governors' Cup

Eliminations

Standings

Game log

|-bgcolor=ccffcc
| 1
| September 22
| Alaska
| W 102–83
| Justin Brownlee (30)
| Justin Brownlee (22)
| LA Tenorio (8)
| Smart Araneta Coliseum
| 1–0
|-bgcolor=ffcccc
| 2
| September 28
| Phoenix
| L 101–103
| Justin Brownlee (25)
| Justin Brownlee (12)
| Justin Brownlee (12)
| Smart Araneta Coliseum
| 1–1

|-bgcolor=ffcccc
| 3
| October 5
| NLEX
| L 111–113 (OT)
| Justin Brownlee (42)
| Justin Brownlee (20)
| Justin Brownlee (10)
| Coca-Cola Arena
| 1–2
|-bgcolor=ccffcc
| 4
| October 13
| San Miguel
| W 129–124
| Justin Brownlee (28)
| Justin Brownlee (14)
| Justin Brownlee (14)
| Smart Araneta Coliseum
| 2–2
|-bgcolor=ccffcc
| 5
| October 20
| Magnolia
| W 105–83
| Justin Brownlee (27)
| Justin Brownlee (9)
| Justin Brownlee (10)
| Smart Araneta Coliseum
| 3–2
|-bgcolor=ccffcc
| 6
| October 26
| Rain or Shine
| W 98–89
| Justin Brownlee (39)
| Justin Brownlee (17)
| Justin Brownlee (8)
| Smart Araneta Coliseum
| 4–2
|-bgcolor=ccffcc
| 7
| October 30
| Blackwater
| W 101–93
| LA Tenorio (20)
| Justin Brownlee (12)
| Justin Brownlee (11)
| Cuneta Astrodome
| 5–2

|-bgcolor=ffcccc
| 8
| November 3
| Meralco
| L 77–101
| Justin Brownlee (18)
| Justin Brownlee (7)
| LA Tenorio (5)
| Smart Araneta Coliseum
| 5–3
|-bgcolor=ccffcc
| 9
| November 8
| TNT
| W 96–93
| Japeth Aguilar (29)
| Justin Brownlee (16)
| Justin Brownlee (6)
| Smart Araneta Coliseum
| 6–3
|-bgcolor=ccffcc
| 10
| November 15
| Columbian
| W 113–90
| Justin Brownlee (26)
| Japeth Aguilar (10)
| LA Tenorio (14)
| Smart Araneta Coliseum
| 7–3
|-bgcolor=ffcccc
| 11
| November 17
| NorthPort
| L 96–98
| Justin Brownlee (31)
| Aguilar, Brownlee (9)
| Scottie Thompson (7)
| Smart Araneta Coliseum
| 7–4

Playoffs

Bracket

Game log

|-bgcolor=ccffcc
| 1
| November 24
| San Miguel
| W 100–97
| Justin Brownlee (41)
| Justin Brownlee (11)
| LA Tenorio (7)
| Smart Araneta Coliseum10,708
| 1–0

|-bgcolor=ffcccc
| 1
| December 14
| NorthPort
| L 90–124
| Justin Brownlee (24)
| Justin Brownlee (19)
| Justin Brownlee (6)
| Smart Araneta Coliseum
| 0–1
|-bgcolor=ccffcc
| 2
| December 16
| NorthPort
| W 113–88
| Stanley Pringle (23)
| Japeth Aguilar (12)
| Scottie Thompson (6)
| Smart Araneta Coliseum
| 1–1
|-bgcolor=ccffcc
| 3
| December 18
| NorthPort
| W 132–105
| Justin Brownlee (41)
| Justin Brownlee (11)
| Scottie Thompson (8)
| Smart Araneta Coliseum
| 2–1
|-bgcolor=ccffcc
| 4
| December 20
| NorthPort
| W 120–107
| Justin Brownlee (36)
| Justin Brownlee (19)
| Justin Brownlee (8)
| Smart Araneta Coliseum
| 3–1

|-bgcolor=ccffcc
| 1
| January 7
| Meralco
| W 91–87
| Justin Brownlee (38)
| Justin Brownlee (16)
| Scottie Thompson (6)
| Smart Araneta Coliseum10,708
| 1–0
|-bgcolor=ffcccc
| 2
| January 10
| Meralco
| L 102–104
| Justin Brownlee (35)
| Justin Brownlee (11)
| Scottie Thompson (7)
| Quezon Convention Center
| 1–1
|-bgcolor=ccffcc
| 3
| January 12
| Meralco
| W 92–84
| Justin Brownlee (24)
| Justin Brownlee (9)
| Justin Brownlee (9)
| Smart Araneta Coliseum16,001
| 2–1
|-bgcolor=ccffcc
| 4
| January 15
| Meralco
| W 94–72
| Justin Brownlee (27)
| Japeth Aguilar (9)
| Justin Brownlee (8)
| Smart Araneta Coliseum11,496
| 3–1
|-bgcolor=ccffcc
| 5
| January 17
| Meralco
| W 105–93
| Japeth Aguilar (25)
| Scottie Thompson (9)
| Justin Brownlee (10)
| Mall of Asia Arena15,146
| 4–1

Transactions

Trades

Pre season

Free Agency

Addition

Subtraction

References

Barangay Ginebra San Miguel seasons
Barangay Ginebra San Miguel